Victor Sandile Xulu (born 11 April 1983) is a former South African cricketer who played at first-class and limited overs level for KwaZulu-Natal during the 2009–10 season.

A wicket-keeper from Durban, Xulu played in the KwaZulu-Natal under-19 side that drew the final of the 2001–02 UCB Under-19 Competition with Western Province. He made his first-class debut for KwaZulu-Natal in March 2010, against Border in the CSA Provincial Three-Day Competition. In what was to be his only first-class match, he played solely as an opening batsman, with the wicket-keeping duties falling to Matthew Boote. He made a pair opening with Boote in each innings, falling twice to Lundi Mbane. In the corresponding one-day fixture between KwaZulu-Natal and Border, Xulu replaced Boote as wicket-keeper. He came in third in the batting order, scoring ten runs from eleven balls, comprising two boundaries (a four and a six).

References

1983 births
Living people
KwaZulu-Natal cricketers
Cricketers from Durban
South African cricketers
Wicket-keepers